Natalie Tschan (born 13 October 1971) is a Swiss former professional tennis player.

Tschan, who comes from Bern, reached a best singles ranking of No. 242 on the professional tour. She featured in the singles qualifying draw at the 1993 Australian Open and played in the main draw of the doubles, making it through to the second round with partner Alexandra Fusai.

ITF Circuit finals

Singles: 3 (1–2)

Doubles: 12 (4–8)

References

External links
 
 

1971 births
Living people
Swiss female tennis players
Sportspeople from Bern